Hosny Adel Abdel Rahman (born December 11, 1967)  is an Egyptian professional football coach and former player. He was previously the manager of Al-Ittihad, Al-Shabab, Al-Batin and Al-Wehda.

Managerial statistics

Managerial record

References

External links

Adel Abdel Rahman at Footballdatabase

Living people
1967 births
Egyptian footballers
Egypt international footballers
1990 FIFA World Cup players
Al Shabab FC (Riyadh) managers
Ittihad FC managers
Al Batin FC managers
Al-Wehda Club (Mecca) managers
Expatriate football managers in Saudi Arabia
Egyptian expatriate sportspeople in Saudi Arabia
Saudi Professional League managers
Association football forwards
Egyptian football managers